Samuel Sahu (called Sam) is the fifth  and current Bishop of Malaita: serving since 2008.

References

Anglican bishops of Malaita
21st-century Anglican bishops in Oceania
Year of birth missing (living people)
Living people